Bobrówko may refer to the following places:
Bobrówko, Strzelce-Drezdenko County in Lubusz Voivodeship (west Poland)
Bobrówko, Sulęcin County in Lubusz Voivodeship (west Poland)
Bobrówko, Warmian-Masurian Voivodeship (north Poland)